The 2024 World Junior Ice Hockey Championships (2024 WJHC) will be the 48th edition of the IIHF World Junior Championship.  It will begin on December 26, 2023 and will end with the gold medal game being played on January 5, 2024. This marks the seventh time that Sweden will host the WJIHC, and the first time in Gothenburg. Canada will be entering the tournament as two time defending champions.

Background
On March 14, 2019, it was announced that Gothenburg would be the host city for 2022. However, due to the COVID-19 pandemic, previous World Junior Championships were relocated and it was announced that Edmonton and Red Deer would host the 2022 tournament, and that Gothenburg would be shifted from 2022 to 2024.

Venues

Top Division

Seeding

Group A (Scandinavium)
 (1)
 (4)
 (5)
 (8)
 (9)

Group B (Frölundaborg)
 (2)
 (3)
 (6)
 (7)
 (11-Promoted)

Group A

Group B

Relegation

Playoff round
Winning teams will be reseeded for the semi-finals in accordance with the following ranking:

higher position in the group
higher number of points
better goal difference
higher number of goals scored for
better seeding coming into the tournament (final placement at the 2023 World Junior Ice Hockey Championships).

Bracket

Quarterfinals

Semifinals

Bronze medal game

Gold medal game

Division I
Main Article: 2024 World Junior Ice Hockey Championships – Division I

Group A
 – relegated from Top Division

 – promoted from Division I B

Group B
 – promoted from Division II A

 – relegated from Division I A

Division II

Group A
 – promoted from Division II B

 – relegated from Division I B

Group B
 - promoted from Division III

 – relegated from Division II A

Division III

 – relegated from Division II B

References

2022
World Junior Championships
World Junior Championships
World Junior Championships, 2024
World Junior Championships, 2024
International sports competitions in Gothenburg
World Championships, Junior
2023–24 in Swedish ice hockey
World Junior Ice Hockey Championships
World Junior Ice Hockey Championships
2020s in Gothenburg